Mohgaon is a town and a nagar parishad in Chhindwara district in the Indian state of Madhya Pradesh.

Geography
It has an average elevation of 366 metres (1,200 feet).

Demographics
 India census, Mohgaon had a population of 9,890. Males constitute 52% of the population and females 48%. Mohgaon has an average literacy rate of 62%, higher than the national average of 59.5%: male literacy is 69%, and female literacy is 55%. In Mohgaon, 14% of the population is under 6 years of age.

References

Cities and towns in Chhindwara district
Chhindwara